Featherstone is a surname. Notable people with the surname include:

Angela Featherstone (born 1965), Canadian actress
Bower Featherstone (born 1940), Canadian civil servant, spy for the Soviet Union
Claudius Cyprian Featherstone (1864–1945), American lawyer and judge
Collis Featherstone (1913–1990), Australian Bahá'í leader
Donald Featherstone (disambiguation), multiple people
Harold G. Featherstone, (1923–2003), American judge and politician
Jim Featherstone (born 1923), British rugby league footballer
James Featherstone (footballer) (born 1979), English footballer
Kevin Featherstone (born 1971), American professional wrestler
Lewis P. Featherstone (1851–1922), American planter, farm activist and politician
Liza Featherstone (born 1969), American journalist
Lynne Featherstone (born 1951), British politician
Matthew Featherstone (born 1970), English born Brazilian cricketer
Michelle Featherstone, British singer-songwriter
Mickey Featherstone (born 1949), American mobster
Mike Featherstone, British academic
Nicky Featherstone (born 1988), English footballer
Norman Featherstone (born 1949), South African cricketer
Simon Featherstone (born 1958), British diplomat
Tony Featherstone (born 1949), Canadian retired professional ice hockey player
Vicky Featherstone (born 1967), British theatre director and artistic director
Willie Featherstone (born 1959), Canadian professional boxer

 Fictional characters
Featherstone family in George Eliot's Middlemarch
Sir Guthrie Featherstone, Queen's Counsel, Head of Chambers, and Judge in John Mortimer's Rumpole of the Bailey

See also
Featherston